Milan Stanislav Ďurica (born 13 August 1925) is a Slovak historian and theologian.

Biography 
Ďurica began his academic career in 1956, as professor of Theology at the Salesian Theological College in Abano Terme. He achieved a Ph.D. in Political Science in 1961 at University of Padua. In 1967 he became professor of political and constitutional history of Eastern European countries at the same university, where he was also Slovak language lecturer. In 1969 he founded the Eastern European Studies Centre (Centro di Studi sull'Europa Orientale) in Padua. He founded and edited Il Mondo Slavo, the yearbook of the Institute of Slavic Philology at the University of Padua.

Since 1993 Ďurica served as professor of church history at the Cyril and Methodius Theological Faculty of the Comenius University in Bratislava. He retired from teaching in 1997.

As a historian, Ďurica mainly concentrated on modern history of Slovakia and on the history of First Slovak Republic. His most successful book, Dejiny Slovenska a Slovákov (History of Slovakia and the Slovaks), remains controversial among Slovak historians and politicians, although it is the best-seller of Slovak history books. Indeed, despite some appreciation for his work on documents from Italian archives, not accessible to other Czechoslovakian historians during the communist regime, he has been criticised as an "ultranationalist". As a theologian, Pope John XXIII appointed him as adviser of the Preparatory Commission of Second Vatican Council.

Bibliography of Ďurica's works represents 1,700 publications, issued in eight languages. For its scientific and cultural activity he was made Grand Officer of the Order of Merit of the Italian Republic in 1995. The Accademia Teatina per le Scienze in Rome awarded him the title of Honorary Academician. In 1991 the Minister of Culture appointed him as the first director of the Slovak Historical Institute in Rome (the institute was closed and re-founded in 2001).

Ďurica also contributed to the first translation into Slovak language of Dante Alighieri, Francesco Petrarca and Ugo Foscolo.

Reception
Ďurica has been criticized for his attempts to rehabilitate the wartime Slovak State and its president, Jozef Tiso, whose actions resulted in the deaths of some 70,000 Jews during the Holocaust in Slovakia. Ďurica claims that Tiso used the power of presidential exemption for Jews to save 35,000 Jews from his regime's own antisemitic policies. According to American historian James Mace Ward and other scholars, evidence for the number of exemptions issued is "straightforward and indisputable": only about 650 exemptions covering 1,000 Jews were issued prior to the end of deportations in 1942, and three-quarters of these Jews were covered by other exemptions. A controversial textbook written by Ďurica presented Tiso and his colleagues as "saviours of the Jewish population" and implied that Jews drafted for forced labor had it better than the non-Jewish Slovak population. The textbook was harshly criticized by historians and later retracted.

Bibliography 
 Dr. Jozef Tiso and the Jewish Problem in Slovakia, 1957
 La Slovacchia a le sue relazioni politiche con la Germania 1938 - 1945. Vol I., Padova, 1964
 Die Slowakei in der Märzkrise 1939, 1964
 Cultural Relations Between Slovakia and Italy in Modern Times, Toronto 1978
 La lingua slovaca. Profilo storico-filologico guida bibliografica, Padova 1983
 Dr. Jozef Kirschbaum und seine politische Tätigkeit im Lichte der Geheimdokumente des Dritten Reiches, München 1988
 La Slovaquie et ses efforts vers l’independance (de 1848 a 1938), In: Slovak Studies 28–29, Bratislava 1988
 Christliches Kulturlebe als historische Konstante der ethnischen Identität der Slowaken, In: Slowakei 26, Bratislava 1989
 Die nationale Identität und ihr historischer Umriss in der slowakischen Wirklichkeit, In: Slowakei 26, Bratislava 1989
 Slovenský národ a jeho štátnosť, Bratislava 1990
 Recepcia F. Petrarcu v slovenskej kultúre, Bratislava 1991
 A Historical Projection of the Heritage of Cyril and Methodius in the Slovak Culture, In: Slovak Review 1, Bratislava 1992
 Andrej Hlinka priekopník sociálnej starostlivosti a demokratických práv slovenského ľudu, Bratislava 1994
 Dejiny Slovenska a Slovákov, Slovenské pedagogické nakladateľstvo, Bratislava 1995
 K otázke počiatkov slovenských dejín, Martin 1995
 Priblížiť sa k pravde, Bratislava 1997
 Milan Rastislav Štefánik vo svetle talianskych dokumentov, THB, 1998
 Slovenská republika 1939-1945, Bratislava 1999, .
 Jozef Tiso (1887-1947), Životopisný profil, Bratislava 2006, .
 Kedy sme vstúpili do dejín? K otázke začiatkov slovenských dejín, Bratislava 2006, .
 Odkedy sme Slováci? Pôvod Slovákov a kresťanstvo, Bratislava 2006, .
 Nacionalizmus alebo národné povedomie? Bratislava 2006, .
 Dejiny Slovenska a Slovákov v časovej následnosti faktov dvoch tisícročí, Bratislava 2007
 Slovenská republika a jej vzťah k Svätej stolici (1939-1945), Bratislava 2007, .
 Priblížiť sa k pravde. Kritický pohľad na Stanovisko Historického ústavu SAV k mojej knihe Dejiny Slovenska a Slovákov, Bratislava 2007, .
 Jozef Tiso v očiach neslovenských autorov, Bratislava 2007, .
 Slobodní murári, Bratislava 2007, .
 Moravskí Slováci. Cyrilo-metodovské dedictvo, Bratislava 2007, .
 Tomáš G. Masaryk a jeho vzťah k Slovákom, Bratislava 2007, .
 Edvard Beneš a jeho vzťah k Slovákom, Bratislava 2008, .
 Jozef Tiso a Židia, Bratislava 2008, .
 Vzťahy medzi Slovákmi a Čechmi, Bratislava 2008, .
 Slováci a Sedembolestná. Kultúrno-historický náčrt, Bratislava 2008, .
 Čo ohrozuje našu štátnosť. K 15. výročiu Slovenskej republiky, Bratislava 2008, .
 Židia zo Slovenska v dejinách kultúry a vedy, Bratislava 2008, .
 Slovenský národný odpor proti nacizmu, Bratislava 2009, .
 Slovenské dejiny a ich historiografia, Bratislava 2009, .
 Národná identita a jej historický profil v slovenskej spoločnosti, Bratislava 2010, .
 Ohrozenia kresťanstva v súčasnej politickej situácii, Bratislava 2010, .
 Z rozhrania svetov. Výber z básnickej tvorby, Bratislava 2010, .
 Ferdinand Ďurčanský a jeho vzťah k Hitlerovmu Nemecku, Bratislava 2011, .

References

Sources

External links and sources
 Milan Stanislav Ďurica, www.osobnosti.sk
 I. Kamenec, Spor o Ďuricovu knihu (Dilema, okt. 1997, str. 23–26)
 Interview with Milan S. Ďurica, (Don Bosco dnes, č. 2, 2001, s. 21–23)

1925 births
Living people
Academic staff of Comenius University
Grand Officers of the Order of Merit of the Italian Republic
Salesians of Don Bosco
20th-century Slovak historians
Academic staff of the University of Padua
University of Padua alumni
People from Sabinov District
Czechoslovak expatriates in Italy
21st-century Slovak historians